The United States Senate Energy and Natural Resources Subcommittee on Energy is one of four subcommittees of the U.S. Senate Energy and Natural Resources Committee.

Jurisdiction
This subcommittee's jurisdiction includes oversight and legislative responsibilities for: 
 
nuclear, coal and synthetic fuels research and development; 
nuclear and non-nuclear energy commercialization projects;
nuclear fuel cycle policy; 
Department of Energy National Laboratories; 
global climate change; 
new technologies research and development; 
nuclear facilities siting and insurance program; 
commercialization of new technologies including, solar energy systems; 
Federal energy conservation programs; 
energy information; 
liquefied natural gas projects; 
oil and natural gas regulation; 
refinery policy; 
coal conversion; 
utility policy; 
Strategic Petroleum Reserves; 
regulation of Trans-Alaska Pipeline System and other oil and gas pipeline transportation systems within Alaska Arctic research and energy development; 
oil, gas and coal production and distribution.

Members, 118th Congress

See also
 U.S. House Natural Resources Subcommittee on Energy and Mineral Resources

References

External links
 U.S. Senate Energy and Natural Resources Subcommittee on Energy, official web site

Energy Senate Energy